Ghislain Van Landeghem (born 18 July 1948) is a Belgian former racing cyclist. He was a professional racer from 1971 to 1981 and rode in the 1974 Tour de France.

Major results
1973
 7th GP Stad Zottegem
1975
 8th Druivenkoers-Overijse
1978
 5th Nationale Sluitingprijs
1980
 1st Omloop Schelde-Durme

References

External links
 

1948 births
Living people
Belgian male cyclists
Place of birth missing (living people)
Cyclists from East Flanders